Willem van den Berg (1 August 1910 – 8 November 1987) was a Dutch fencer. He competed in the individual and team sabre and team foil events at the 1948 Summer Olympics.

References

1910 births
1987 deaths
Dutch male fencers
Olympic fencers of the Netherlands
Fencers at the 1948 Summer Olympics
Sportspeople from Rotterdam
20th-century Dutch people